Canada has participated in 70 of 79 Ice Hockey World Championships, an annual ice hockey tournament organized by the International Ice Hockey Federation (IIHF). During the first 40 years of the tournament (1920–1961), Canada did not have a national team, instead choosing to send a club team, typically the Allan Cup winner. A national team program, consisting of amateur players, was implemented following the 1961 tournament. By the late 1960s, the Canadian Amateur Hockey Association (CAHA) felt their amateur players could no longer be competitive and pushed for the ability to use players from professional leagues. At the IIHF Congress in 1969, the IIHF voted to allow Canada to use nine non-National Hockey League (NHL) professional players at the 1970 World Championships, but the decision was reversed in January 1970. In response, Canada withdrew from international ice hockey competition. Canada's ice hockey team did not participate in the 1972 and 1976 Winter Olympics. Günther Sabetzki became president of the IIHF in 1975 and helped to resolve the dispute with the CAHA. The IIHF agreed to allow "open competition" between all players in the World Championships, and moved the competition to later in the season so players not involved in the NHL playoffs could participate. The first open World Championship was held in 1977 in Vienna, Austria, and saw the first participation of active NHL players, including team captain Phil Esposito, a two-time NHL MVP. Many of the players on the Canadian team were not prepared for the tournament and were unfamiliar with the gameplay at the international level. The team finished fourth. Hockey Canada is responsible for the Canadian team roster and operations.

Since 1977, Canada has participated in all 39 tournaments, sending 66 goaltenders and 492 skaters (forwards and defencemen). During this period, Canadian teams have won 18 medals: six gold medals, seven silver medals and five bronze medals. Thirty-one players have been inducted into the Hockey Hall of Fame and sixteen into Canada's Sports Hall of Fame. Wayne Gretzky and Mario Lemieux have also been inducted into the IIHF Hall of Fame and are the only players to have been inducted into all three. Dany Heatley and Shane Doan have each won five medals (two gold, three silver), more than any player since 1977. Eric Brewer has won the most gold medals, with three. Heatley, who has scored 38 goals and registered 62 points over six tournaments, is Canada's all-time goals and points leader at the tournament since 1977. Twenty-six players have served as team captain during this period. Ryan Smyth has played for eight teams and captained six (from 2001 to 2005, and in 2010), more than any other player since 1977 in both cases, and has been given the nickname "Captain Canada".


Key

Goaltenders

Skaters

See also
 List of Olympic men's ice hockey players for Canada
 List of IIHF World Under-20 Championship players for Canada
 List of Canadian national ice hockey team rosters

References
General
 Download (PDF link)

Specific

External links
 Hockey Canada – Official website

Canada
 
World